Annette Carol Bening (born May 29, 1958) is an American actress. She has received various accolades throughout her career spanning over four decades, including a British Academy Film Award and two Golden Globe Awards, in addition to nominations for a Primetime Emmy Award, two Tony Awards, and four Academy Awards.

Bening began her career on stage with the Colorado Shakespeare Festival company in 1980, and played Lady Macbeth in 1984 at the American Conservatory Theater. She received nominations for the Tony Award for Best Featured Actress in a Play for her Broadway debut in Coastal Disturbances and for the Tony Award for Best Actress in a Play for All My Sons. She is a four-time Academy Award nominee for her performances in the films The Grifters (1990), American Beauty (1999), Being Julia (2004), and The Kids Are All Right (2010). In 2006, she received a motion picture star on the Hollywood Walk of Fame for her achievements in the film industry.

For American Beauty, Bening won the BAFTA Award and the Screen Actors Guild Award for Best Actress. She has also received two Golden Globe Awards for her performances in Being Julia and The Kids Are All Right. She was nominated for the Primetime Emmy Award for Outstanding Lead Actress in a Miniseries or a Movie for Mrs. Harris, and in 2019, she played the roles of Supreme Intelligence and Mar-Vell / Wendy Lawson in the Marvel Cinematic Universe film Captain Marvel, which became her highest-grossing release.

Early life
Bening was born in Topeka, Kansas, to Shirley Katherine (née Ashley) and Arnett Grant Bening. Her mother was a church singer and soloist, and her father was a sales training consultant and insurance salesman. Her parents, originally from Iowa, were practicing Episcopalians and conservative Republicans. She is of mostly German and English descent.

The youngest of four children, she has an older sister Jane, and two older brothers Bradley and Byron. The family moved to Wichita, Kansas, in 1959, where she spent her early childhood. When Bening was in elementary school, her father relocated the family to San Diego, California, where she spent the remainder of her youth. She began acting in junior high school, playing the lead in The Sound of Music. She graduated in 1975 from San Diego's Patrick Henry High School, where she studied drama. She then spent a year working as a cook on a charter boat taking fishing parties out on the Pacific Ocean, and scuba diving for recreation. Bening attended San Diego Mesa College and graduated with a degree in Theatre Arts at San Francisco State University.

Career

1980s
Bening began her career on stage with the Colorado Shakespeare Festival company in 1980, and appeared in plays at the San Diego Repertory Theatre. She was a member of the acting company at the American Conservatory Theater in San Francisco while studying acting as part of the Advanced Theatre Training Program. There, she starred in such productions as Shakespeare's Macbeth as Lady Macbeth. Bening also starred in productions of Pygmalion and The Cherry Orchard at the Denver Center Theatre Company during the 1985–86 season. She made her Broadway debut in 1987, garnering a Tony Award nomination for Best Featured Actress in a Play and receiving a Theatre World Award for her performance in Coastal Disturbances. Bening made her film debut in The Great Outdoors (1988), starring Dan Aykroyd and John Candy. Her next role was as the Marquise de Merteuil in Valmont (1989) opposite Colin Firth.

1990s

She made her breakout role in The Grifters (1990), in which she was nominated for the Academy Award for Best Supporting Actress. In 1991, she portrayed Virginia Hill in Barry Levinson's biopic Bugsy, alongside Warren Beatty. Bening co-starred with Harrison Ford in Regarding Henry. In 1994, Bening and Beatty starred together again, in Love Affair. In 1995, Bening played a leading role in The American President, with Michael Douglas, a role she followed with Tim Burton's sci-fi spoof Mars Attacks! (1996), and The Siege (1998), a thriller with Denzel Washington and Bruce Willis. She starred in Sam Mendes' directorial debut film American Beauty (1999). The film won five Academy Awards, including for Best Picture. For her performance as the materialistic wife Carolyn Burnham, she was nominated for an Academy Award for Best Actress and won the Screen Actors Guild Award for Outstanding Performance by a Female Actor in a Leading Role. Bening starred in other films, including In Dreams (1999) and What Planet Are You From? (2000).

In 1999, Bening returned to the stage for the first time in 10 years playing the title role in Hedda Gabler at the Geffen Playhouse in Los Angeles.  The Los Angeles Times praised her performance saying "Bening uses her vocal instrument to fine effect, without throwing it around... In the movies you don't always hear what Bening can do with that voice, especially when she's playing virtuous, "sensible" types... But Ibsen's antiheroine—thwarted sensualist, a woman wrestling with her inner troll, belle of a ball that never comes—is neither virtuous nor sensible. She's no easy-to-read villain, either, nor a mere vindictive brat, though plenty of actresses have reduced her thus. Bening lays into the venomous sarcasm mighty heavily, but she's cagey enough to avoid reductive extremes."

2000s
Bening played Sue Barlow in Open Range (2003). She played the title role in Being Julia (2004), in which she won a Golden Globe, NBR Best Actress, was a runner-up for NYFCC and was nominated by SAG and for the Academy Award for her performance. She was nominated for a Primetime Emmy Award for her role of Jean Harris the 2005 HBO film Mrs. Harris. She replaced Julianne Moore and starred in the film adaptation of Running with Scissors (2006), for which she was nominated for a Golden Globe. Bening starred in The Women (2008) remake. In 2009, Bening starred in a new interpretation of the Euripides classic Medea at UCLA's Freud Playhouse. She received positive reviews for her performance in the independent film Mother and Child (2009).

2010s
In 2010, she starred in The Female of the Species, Joanna Murray-Smith's comedy, at the Geffen Playhouse in Los Angeles. Later that year, Bening received critical acclaim for her performance in The Kids Are All Right; a reviewer said that she "deserves an Oscar" and another praised her "sublime" performance. For her role Bening won a Golden Globe, NYFFC Best Actress, and was runner-up for a NSFC award. She was also nominated for a SAG award, a BAFTA award, and for the Academy Award for the performance.

In 2012, Bening's audiobook recording of Virginia Woolf's Mrs. Dalloway was released at Audible.com. In 2014, she starred in Shakespeare's King Lear at the Delacorte Theater in Central Park, as part of the Public Theatre's Free Shakespeare in the Park. It marked her first New York stage appearance in twenty years. Bening starred in Dan Fogelman's 2015 American comedy drama, Danny Collins, with Al Pacino. In 2016, Bening starred in Mike Mills's comedy drama 20th Century Women alongside Elle Fanning, Greta Gerwig, and Billy Crudup. She earned a Golden Globe nomination for her performance In 2017, she appeared in Film Stars Don't Die in Liverpool as Gloria Grahame alongside Jamie Bell, Vanessa Redgrave, and Julie Walters. She was nominated for a BAFTA Award for Best Actress in a Leading Role for her performance.

In 2019, Bening returned to the Broadway stage after a 32-year absence. She starred in the revival of Arthur Miller's All My Sons alongside Tracy Letts at the Roundabout Theatre Company's American Airlines Theatre. The play opened on April 4, 2019, and closed on June 23, 2019. She was nominated for the Tony Award for Best Actress in a Play.

She serves as Vice Chair on the board of trustees for The Actors Fund.

Personal life
Bening married James Steven White, a  choreographer, on  May 26, 1984. They divorced in 1991. She has been married to actor Warren Beatty since March 3, 1992. They have four children.

Awards and nominations

Academy Awards

Primetime Emmy Awards

Tony Awards

References

External links

 
 
 
 
 

1958 births
20th-century American actresses
21st-century American actresses
Actresses from Kansas
Actresses from San Diego
Actors from Topeka, Kansas
Actors from Wichita, Kansas
American people of English descent
American people of German descent
American Conservatory Theater alumni
American film actresses
American Shakespearean actresses
American stage actresses
American television actresses
Best Actress BAFTA Award winners
Best Musical or Comedy Actress Golden Globe (film) winners
Kansas Democrats
Living people
Outstanding Performance by a Cast in a Motion Picture Screen Actors Guild Award winners
Outstanding Performance by a Female Actor in a Leading Role Screen Actors Guild Award winners
Patrick Henry High School (California) alumni
San Francisco State University alumni
San Diego Mesa College alumni